Metro FC (formerly Metro Claremont Football Club) is a football club formed in 1941 in the northern suburb of Claremont, Hobart, Tasmania. They play at North Chigwell Oval. It has a range of teams for all ages and genders playing in competitions run by the Football Federation Tasmania. Its teams range from under 7s right through to seniors.  The teams' colours are yellow and blue.

Metro were relegated to the Southern Division 1 competition in 2008 and have placed 2nd in all but 2 seasons. In 2010 Metro narrowly missed out on promotion to the Southern Tasmanian Premier League, that point the highest league on offer in Tasmania coming second behind Beachside with only one spot for promotion on offer. Metro had a very successful 2014 season taking out the State Vase Cup and Division 1 and 2 championships getting promoted to the Southern Championship for the 2015 season.

Honours
State Championships: 4 times (1950,1951,1952,1954)
Southern Premierships: 5 times (1949,1950,1951,1952,1954)
Southern Premiership Runners-up: 4 times (1946,1947,1948,1953)
Div 1 winners: once (2014)
Div 2 winners: once (2014)
KO Cup Runners-up: 2 times (1970,1971)
Falkinder Cup Winners: Once (1947)
Falkinder Cup Runners-up: 5 times (1949,1950,1953,1955,1957)
Summer Cup Winners: Once (1995)
Summer Cup Runners-up: Once (1977)
Vase Cup Winners: 2 times (2000,2014)
 Southern Championship 4: Winner (2019)
 Social League 4 Cup: Winner (2019)

External links
Metro FC – Official Website

Association football clubs established in 1941
Soccer clubs in Tasmania
1941 establishments in Australia